Exponential may refer to any of several mathematical topics related to exponentiation, including:
Exponential function, also:
Matrix exponential, the matrix analogue to the above
Exponential decay, decrease at a rate proportional to value
Exponential discounting, a specific form of the discount function, used in the analysis of choice over time
Exponential growth, where the growth rate of a mathematical function is proportional to the function's current value
Exponential map (Riemannian geometry), in Riemannian geometry
Exponential map (Lie theory), in Lie theory
Exponential notation, also known as scientific notation, or standard form
Exponential object, in category theory
Exponential time, in complexity theory
in probability and statistics:
Exponential distribution, a family of continuous probability distributions
Exponentially modified Gaussian distribution, describes the sum of independent normal and exponential random variables
Exponential family, a parametric set of probability distributions of a certain form
Exponential smoothing, a technique that can be applied to time series data
Exponential type
 Exponential type or function type, in type theory
 Exponential type in complex analysis
Topics listed at list of exponential topics

Exponential may also refer to:
Exponential Technology, a vendor of PowerPC microprocessors

See also 

 Exponent (disambiguation)

Mathematics disambiguation pages